Abdulrahman Al-Fadhel (born 9 July 1994) is a Kuwaiti rower. He competed in the 2020 Summer Olympics.

References

External links
 

1994 births
Living people
Kuwaiti male rowers
Olympic rowers of Kuwait
Rowers at the 2020 Summer Olympics